The Cégep de Granby is part of Quebec's CEGEP junior college network. It is located in the city of Granby. Almost 1800 students attend classes there full-time.

History
The college traces its origins to the merger of several institutions which became public ones in 1967, when the Quebec system of CEGEPs was created.

Programs
The CEGEP offers two types of programs: pre-university and technical. The pre-university programs, which take two years to complete, cover the subject matters which roughly correspond to the additional year of high school given elsewhere in Canada in preparation for a chosen field in university. The technical programs, which take three-years to complete, applies to students who wish to pursue a skill trade. The Cégep currently offers 8 technical programs and 3 pre-university programs.

See also
List of colleges in Quebec 
Higher education in Quebec

References
The website of the student newspaper, the student union and of all of the student clubs of the Cégep
The official website of the Cegep

Granby
Buildings and structures in Granby, Quebec
Education in Montérégie